Qureq (also Romanized as Qūreq and Qowreq; also known as Kuhīk, Kurakh, Kūyek, Qoroq, Qowrekh, and Qūrakh) is a village in Amirabad Rural District, Muchesh District, Kamyaran County, Kurdistan Province, Iran. At the 2006 census, its population was 651, in 177 families. The village is populated by Kurds.

References 

Towns and villages in Kamyaran County
Kurdish settlements in Kurdistan Province